Conservation ministry may refer to:

 Minister of Conservation (Manitoba), a provincial cabinet minister
 Minister of Conservation (New Zealand), a government minister
 Minister for the Environment (Western Australia), formerly Minister for Conservation and the Environment

See also
 Environment minister, a cabinet position in various countries or states
 Conservation (disambiguation)
 Ministry (disambiguation)